Daniel Flaherty (born June 11, 1993) is an American actor, known for his role as Stanley Lucerne on the MTV teen drama series Skins.

Life and career
Flaherty started studying acting at age 11. When he turned 13, he booked his first short film, My First Kiss. By the age of 17, he was already a veteran of the indie-arty short film scene, having acted in Spark, Vacant, The Parade, and Portnoy.

In 2010, Flaherty was cast as Stanley Lucerne in the MTV adaptation of the British teen drama Skins. The character is based on the character Sid Jenkins from the original British series. Daniel originally went to the New York open call, but didn’t get a callback. His agent arranged a second private audition, in which Flaherty won the role. Daniel's favorite part of working on Skins is getting to contribute to the development of his character. In 2012, Flaherty was cast as Tommy, a victim of school bullying, in the independent dramedy Contest. The following year, he appeared in a small role in Martin Scorsese's The Wolf of Wall Street. In September 2016, it was announced that Flaherty would join the cast of the upcoming film, The Garden Left Behind, directed by Flavio Alves, starring Michael Madsen and Ed Asner.

Personal life
Flaherty is from Glen Rock, New Jersey, where he attended Glen Rock High School. He is the youngest of four siblings. He spends his free time skateboarding, playing guitar, writing songs, and singing in his band, MF Killer Starfish. His resume lists "fearless roller coaster rider" as one of his skills.

Filmography

Film

Television

References

External links
 

1993 births
21st-century American male actors
American male child actors
American male film actors
American male television actors
Living people
Male actors from New Jersey
Glen Rock High School alumni
People from Glen Rock, New Jersey